HMS Gurkha (F122) was a  of the Royal Navy. She was named after an ethnic group located in Nepal, and who continue to serve in the British Army. She was sold to the Indonesian Navy in 1984 and renamed KRI Wilhelmus Zakarias Yohannes (332).

Design
The Tribal-, or Type 81-class, frigates were developed in the mid-1950s as a General Purpose frigate, capable of use in both anti-submarine and anti-aircraft duties in a full-scale war, while serving for Cold War policing duties in peace-time, in particular to replace the old s serving in the Persian Gulf.

Displacement was  standard and  full load. Propulsion was by a single-shaft Combined steam and gas (COSAG) arrangement, effectively half of the powerplant of the s.

The ships were fitted with two QF 4.5-in (113 mm) Mark 5 guns, salvaged from scrapped Second World War destroyers, mounted fore and aft. It was intended to fit two Seacat anti-aircraft missile launchers, but these were not ready in time, and Gurkha completed with two 40 mm Bofors guns instead, with Seacat replacing the Bofors guns on refit. For anti-submarine and anti-ship duties, a hangar and flight deck for a single Westland Wasp helicopter was fitted, while a Limbo anti-submarine mortar provided close-in anti-submarine armament. 
Gurkha was fitted with a large Type 965 long range air search radar on a lattice foremast, with a Type 993 short range air/surface target indicating radar and Type 978 navigation radar also fitted. An MRS3 fire control system was carried to direct the 4.5-inch guns. The ship had a sonar suite of Type 177 medium range search sonar, Type 162 bottom search and Type 170 attack sonar. Type 199 Variable Depth Sonar (VDS) was fitted in 1969. The ship had a crew of 253 officers and other ranks.

Royal Navy service

Gurkha was ordered under the 1955–56 Naval Estimates from John I. Thornycroft & Company, of Woolston, Hampshire, at a cost of £4,865,000 She was laid down on 3 November 1958, was launched on 11 July 1960 and commissioned on 13 February 1963, joining the 9th Frigate Squadron in the Middle East. In 1965 she was present at Portsmouth Navy Days, and again deployed to the Middle East with the 9th Frigate Squadron. On 19 June 1966, Gurkha sailed from Aden to the Seychelles to support the Seychelles police as a series of strikes threatened violence.  On 14 January 1967 she commenced her third commission, leaving British waters on 24 July. She served on the Beira Patrol and during the withdrawal of British forces from Aden before carrying out patrol operations in the Persian Gulf, returning to Rosyth on 14 May 1968.

In 1975, Gurkha deployed to the West Indies, where the ship performed various duties. In 1976, Gurkha supported Royal Navy efforts against Iceland during the Third Cod War. She sustained superficial damage on 7 May when the patrol ship  attempted to force the ship towards the British trawler Ross Ramilles, during which Óðinn collided with Gurkha. In that collision Óðinns port propeller was damaged by Gurkhas starboard stabiliser, forcing her to return to port for repairs.

Gurkha was present at the 1977 Spithead Fleet Review, held in honour of Queen Elizabeth II's Silver Jubilee. At this time she was part of the 1st Frigate Squadron.

Gurkha was reduced to the reserve in 1980, being placed in the Standby Squadron. Although she had been put on the disposal list, Gurkha was removed from the reserve during the Falklands War and prepared for active service, recommissioning on 24 July. Gurkha remained in home waters, fulfilling duties in the absence of ships that were operating in the South Atlantic.

In October 1982, Gurkha became Gibraltar Guardship, following this was a deployment to the Caribbean late in 1982 on "Carib Train" returning to the UK in early 1983. During this later part of her life she had a section of Gurkhas onboard instead of the usual Royal Marine contingent.

Indonesian Navy service
After being decommissioned in March 1984, Gurkha was sold to Indonesia in April that year, and after a refit at Vosper Thornycroft's Woolston, Southampton shipyard, the ship was commissioned into the Indonesian Navy on 21 October 1985. She was renamed KRI Wilhelmus Zakarias Yohannes for the Indonesian national hero Wilhelmus Zakaria Johannes, a radiologist and specialist in X-ray technology. The frigate was stricken from service in 2000.

References

Publications

External links

 

Tribal-class frigates
Ships built in Southampton
1960 ships
Ships of the Fishery Protection Squadron of the United Kingdom
Khristina Tiyahahu-class frigates
Ships built by John I. Thornycroft & Company